Gian Vittorio Rossi, also known as Giano Nicio Eritreo, (1577–1647) was an Italian poet, philologist, and historian.

Life and works 
Rossi was born in Rome to a well-to-do family and lived his entire life in the city of his birth.  He was educated by the Jesuits at the Collegio Romano distinguishing himself by his extraordinary command of Latin.  At the age of 19 he received his laurea in jurisprudence at La Sapienza and in  1603 became a member of the Accademia degli Umoristi. The subsequent misfortunes of his family forced him to enter the legal profession. He remained in a precarious financial position until he received an appointment as secretary to Cardinal  Andrea Baroni Peretti Montalto  in 1610. After the cardinal's death in 1628 Rossi retired to a small house on the Gianicolo in Rome which became the centre for a circle of his fellow intellectuals including Alessandro Tassoni, Giovanni Ciampoli, Leone Allacci, Gabriel Naudé,  and Fabio Chigi (the future Pope Alexander VII, whom Rossi called "Tyrrhenus). The image of Rossi that emerges from writings about him and from his own works is that of a cultured man, a meticulous philologist, and a tolerant thinker. His principal work, Pinacotheca Imaginum Illustrium containing  three hundred short biographies of his contemporaries, both  men and women, was one of the earliest examples of an Italian literary history, a genre which was to be developed in the 18th century by Ludovico Muratori and Girolamo Tiraboschi.

Works 
 Dialogi: Convivium villae Syrorum; Quid in scriptore historiae requiretur; De tolerantia malorum, Parisiis : apud Iacobum Villery, in palatio sub porticu Delphinali, 1643
 Pinacotheca imaginum illustrium, doctrinae el ingenii laude, virorum, qui, auctore superstite, diemv suum obierunt, Coloniae Vbiorum : apud Iodocum Kalcovium & socios, (3 volumes) 1643-1648;
 Documenta sacra : Ex Euangeliis quae dominicis per annum & nonnullis aliis festis diebus leguntur in ecclesia, Coloniae Ubiorum : apud Iodocum Kalcovium & socios, 1645
 Eudemiae libri decem, Coloniae Vbiorum i.e. Leida : apud Iodocum Kalcouium & socios, 1645
 Exempla virtutum et vitiorum, Coloniae Vbiorum, i.e. Amsterdam : apud Iodocum Kalcovium et socios, 1645
 Opuscola spiritualia tria; I. Supplex libellus ad deum & B.V. matrem. II. Paradoxa christiana. III. Sermones de quatuor nouissimis, Coloniae Vbiorum : apud Iodocum Kalcouium & socios, 1648
 Dialogi septendecim, Coloniae Vbiorum i.e. Amsterdam : apud Iodocum Kalcouium & socios, (2 volumes) 1645-1649
 Epistolae ad diversos, Coloniae Vbiorum i.e. Amsterdam : apud Iodocum Kalcovium & socios, 1645-1649
Orationes viginti duae, Coloniae Ubiorum : apud Iodocum Kalcovivum & Socios, 1649
 Epistolae ad tyrrhenum et ad diversos notis illustratae indice necessario auctoris vita et epistola priore editione haud comprehensa auctiores ac emendatiores editae a Io. Christiano Fischero..., Coloniae ubiorum : apud Iodocum Kalcovium, 1738

Sources 
Aikin, John (1813). "Rossi, Gian-Vittorio" in General biography: or, Lives, critical and historical, of the most eminent persons of all ages, countries, conditions, and professions,, Vol. 8, pp. 626–627. G. G. and J. Robinson.
Doglio, Maria Luisa (1973). "Rossi, Gian Vittorio, detto Giano Nicio Eritreo (1577-1647)" in Vittore Branca (ed.), Dizionario critico della Letteratura Italiana, Vol. 3, pp. 252–253. Turin: UTET 
Gerboni, Luigi (1899). Un umanista nel Secento: Giano Nicio Eritreo. Città di Castello: Lapi

External links
 Works by and about Gian Vittorio Rossi on WorldCat
 

Italian philologists
Italian Renaissance writers
Italian poets
Italian male poets
1577 births
1647 deaths
Writers from Rome
17th-century Latin-language writers